Thank You is a 2007 South Korean television series starring Jang Hyuk, Gong Hyo-jin, Seo Shin-ae, Shin Sung-rok and Shin Goo. It aired on MBC from March 21 to May 10, 2007 on Wednesdays and Thursdays at 21:55 for 16 episodes.

The drama was actor Jang Hyuk's successful comeback after his mandatory military service and draft-dodging scandal. He gained the empathy of viewers after portraying a self-centered doctor whose life changes when he meets a single mother and her HIV-positive daughter.

Synopsis
Doctor Min Gi-seo (Jang Hyuk) is a surgeon whose wealthy background and superior talent causes him to be arrogant and curt with others. But when his girlfriend Ji-min (Choi Kang-hee) dies of cancer after he failed to save her on the operating table, he is haunted by her confession that she had unwittingly given a young girl HIV via a contaminated blood transfusion when she was a medical intern years ago and never owned up to her mistake. Grieving and needing to make amends on Ji-min's behalf, Gi-seo searches for the child Bom (Korean for "spring"), and finds her living on Pureun-do ("Blue Island"). The precocious eight-year-old Bom (Seo Shin-ae) is innocently unaware of her condition, and she lives happily with her mother Young-shin (Gong Hyo-jin), and her great-grandfather Mr. Lee (Shin Goo) who's always wandering off and loves choco pie. Ever since Bom's diagnosis, Young-shin has worked hard to care for her daughter and senile grandfather, keeping a strong face and cheery front despite their poor circumstances and the difficulties of being a single mother. Young-shin has always been mum about Bom's paternity, but in the small community of Pureun-do, rumors are rife that the father is Choi Seok-hyun (Shin Sung-rok), son of the richest woman (Kang Boo-ja) in town. Seok-hyun currently resides in Seoul with his fiancée (Kim Sung-eun), until work-related matters take him back to the island for the first time in a decade. Upon seeing Young-shin again, Seok-hyun had no idea that she'd had a child, and doesn't believe her assertions that Bom isn't his. As their paths continue to cross, he becomes jealous of Gi-seo and realizes that he isn't quite over her. Meanwhile, to keep an eye on Bom, Gi-seo decides to rent a room at Young-shin's house. At first he mocks the seemingly backward, rural day-to-day life on Pureun-do, but as he observes the Lee family and their constant kindness and selflessness at close quarters, Gi-seo finds himself slowly changing and falling in love with Young-shin. But when the townspeople later learn that Bom has HIV, they must all deal with the fear and discrimination that follows.

Cast
Jang Hyuk as Min Gi-seo 
Gong Hyo-jin as Lee Young-shin
Seo Shin-ae as Lee Bom, Young-shin's daughter
Shin Sung-rok as Choi Seok-hyun
Shin Goo as Mr. Lee / Lee Byung-gook, Young-shin's grandfather
Kang Boo-ja as Kang Gook-ja, Seok-hyun's mother
Kim Sung-eun as Seo Eun-hee, Seok-hyun's fiancée
Ryu Seung-soo as Oh Jong-soo, local doctor of Pureun-do Public Health Center
Jo Mi-ryung as Park So-ran, nurse
Kim Ha-kyun as Park Taek-dong, shopkeeper
Jeon Won-joo as Song Chang-ja, neighbor with a crush on Mr. Lee
Kim Ki-bang as Song Doo-seob, Chang-ja's son
Kil Yong-woo as Min Joon-ho, Gi-seo's father
Hong Yeo-jin as Kang Hye-jung, Gi-seo's mother
Yoo Min-ho as Lee Young-woo, Young-shin's brother
Yang Hyun-woo as Choi Young-joo, Seok-hyun's nephew
Yoo Yeon-mi as Bo-ram, Bom's friend
Choi Kang-hee as Cha Ji-min, Gi-seo's girlfriend (cameo, ep 1)
Kim Soo-ro as Dr. Oh's photographer brother (cameo, ep 16)
 Um Hyo-sup (cameo, ep 12-13)

Production
Jang Hyuk reportedly studied the 1998 film Christmas in August in preparation for his role. He said at the press conference, "I want to delicately express a man who is transformed by love. [...] This drama deals with the disease HIV/AIDS, but it is also a story of hope and miracles."

Jang and Gong Hyo-jin previously starred together in the 2001 film Volcano High. This was also Gong's second collaboration with writer Lee Kyung-hee, after the 2003 drama Sang Doo! Let's Go to School.

Choi Kang-hee, who made a cameo appearance in episode 1, was dating director Lee Jae-dong at the time (they had previously worked together on the 2004 drama Sweet Buns).

Director Lee Jae-dong spent weeks searching for the ideal shooting location for the fictional Pureun-do ("Blue Island"). He settled on Jeungdo, Sinan County, South Jeolla Province, which is located on the Korean east coast. Young-shin and Bom's house in the TV series was specifically chosen by Lee, and renovations were made to the house with permission from the town residents.

Reception
Compared to its competition in the same timeslot, The Devil (KBS2) and Witch Yoo Hee (SBS), Thank You premiered quietly to little hype or pre-show buzz due to lead actor Jang Hyuk's draft-dodging scandal. But it unexpectedly rose to number one in its timeslot, making Jang's comeback a success.

Apart from the cast and writer Lee Kyung-hee who won recognition at the MBC Drama Awards and the Baeksang Arts Awards, respectively, the TV series also received the Special Media Award from Amnesty International. The drama was recognized for "its frank, yet sensitive portrayal of a young HIV patient and her family and friends; it dealt with a touchy subject that had not been broached in other TV dramas and taught the audience to respect AIDS patients and other underprivileged members of our society."

Ratings

Source: TNmS Media Korea

Awards
Amnesty International
10th Special Media Award (2007)

2007 MBC Drama Awards
Top Excellence Award, Actress: Gong Hyo-jin
Golden Acting Award, Actor in a Miniseries: Jang Hyuk
Best Young Actress: Seo Shin-ae

2008 Baeksang Arts Awards
Best TV Screenplay: Lee Kyung-hee

Remake
A Chinese remake titled Angel's Happiness aired in 2017, starring Ming Dao and Cecilia Liu.

International broadcast
It aired in Japan on cable channel LaLaTV in 2008, followed by reruns on terrestrial network TV Tokyo.

On defunct channel Q Channel 11 Philippines Aired This Drama at Middle of 2010

It aired in Thailand on Channel 7 every Saturday and Sunday at 9.15 a.m. starting from July 3, 2010.

References

External links
 Thank You official MBC website 
 Thank You at MBC Global Media
 
 

2007 South Korean television series debuts
2007 South Korean television series endings
MBC TV television dramas
Korean-language television shows
South Korean romance television series
South Korean melodrama television series
Television shows written by Lee Kyung-hee
HIV/AIDS in television
Television series by IHQ (company)